Paul Ausserleitner (3 February 1925 – 9 January 1952) was an Austrian ski jumper. He died in an accident in Bischofshofen's ski jumping hill while on a training jump in 1952. To honour his memory, the hill was renamed after the accident to Paul-Ausserleitner-Schanze. Ausserleitner holds the hill record in the K-50 hill in Gaisberg, Salzburg with 55 metres (achieved in 1949). The Gaisberg hill was later destroyed.

References

1925 births
1952 deaths
Austrian male ski jumpers
People from St. Johann im Pongau District
Skiing deaths
Sport deaths in Austria
Sportspeople from Salzburg (state)
20th-century Austrian people